Hamel is the surname of:

 Alan Hamel (born 1936), Canadian entertainer, producer and television host
 Charles Hamel (1930—2015), American congressional aide and oil industry whistleblower
 Charles D. Hamel (c. 1882–1970), judge of the United States Board of Tax Appeals
 Dean Hamel (born 1961), American National Football League player
 Denis Hamel (born 1977), Canadian former professional ice hockey player
 Eddy Hamel (1902–1943), Jewish-American soccer player
 Edith Hamel, Canadian neurologist
 Ernest Hamel (1826–1898), French historian
 Gary Hamel (born 1954), business theorist
 Georg Hamel (1877–1954), German mathematician
 Gilles Hamel (born 1960), Canadian retired professional ice hockey player
 Gustav Hamel (1889–1914), pioneer aviator
 Hendrick Hamel (1630–1692), Dutch writer, the first Westerner to provide a first hand account of Joseon Korea
 Jacques Hamel (1930–2016), French Roman Catholic priest
 Jean-Marc Hamel (born 1925), Canadian government official
 Jean Hamel (born 1952), retired professional ice hockey player
 Mike Hamel (born 1952), American children's author, journalist, philosopher and former theologian
 Pierre Hamel (born 1952), retired professional ice hockey player
 Peter Michael Hamel (born 1947), German composer
 Veronica Hamel (born 1943), American actress and model
 Wouter Hamel (born 1977), Dutch pop singer

See also
 Van Hamel, a list of people surnamed Van Hamel, van Hamel or Vanhamel
 Hammel (surname), a list of people surnamed Hammel or Hammell

Surnames of Norman origin